The Work Group (stylized as The WORK Group) was an American record label.

History 
In July 1999, founders Jeff Ayeroff and Jordan Harris left the label.

Catalog

Artists

Tatyana Ali (MJJ Music/Work)
Fiona Apple (Clean Slate/Work)
Elephant Ride
Dan Bern
Eagle-Eye Cherry
Esthero
Neil Finn (US/Canada)
Imperial Drag
Rebbie Jackson (MJJ Music/Work)
Jamiroquai
Puff Johnson
Diana King
Len
Jennifer Lopez
Mary Lou Lord
Men of Vizion (MJJ Music/Work)
Mercury Rev
Midnight Oil
Morley
Ned's Atomic Dustbin
Heather Nova
Pond
Pressure Drop
Sabelle
Schtum
Sponge
Cree Summer
Chris Whitley
Count Bass D

See also 
 List of record labels

References 

American record labels
Sony Music
Defunct record labels of the United States
Epic Records
Record labels established in 1992
Record labels disestablished in 1999